The following is a list of notable deaths in October 1994.

Entries for each day are listed alphabetically by surname. A typical entry lists information in the following sequence:
 Name, age, country of citizenship at birth, subsequent country of citizenship (if applicable), reason for notability, cause of death (if known), and reference.

October 1994

1
David Berg, 75, American founder and leader of religious movement The Family International.
Ron Herron, 64, English architect and teacher.
Bud Houser, 93, American field athlete.
Donald Roy Irvine, 74, Canadian politician.
Oluyemi Kayode, 26, Nigerian sprinter, traffic collision.
Paul Lorenzen, 79, German philosopher and mathematician.
Marjorie Weaver, 81, American actress, heart attack.

2
Matthew Black, 86, Scottish minister and biblical scholar.
Claude Harris, Jr., 54, American politician.
Harry Hodgkinson, 81, British writer, journalist, and naval intelligence officer.
Harriet Nelson, 85, American singer and actress (The Adventures of Ozzie and Harriet), heart failure.

3
Tim Asch, 62, American anthropologist, photographer, and ethnographic filmmmaker, cancer.
Virginia Dale, 77, American actress and dancer.
Lassi Parkkinen, 77, Finnish speed skater.
Heinz Rühmann, 92, German film actor.
Prince Max Emanuel of Thurn and Taxis, 92, German Benedictine and nobleman.
Dub Taylor, 87, American actor (The Wild Bunch, Bonnie and Clyde, Casey Jones).

4
Yardena Alotin, 64, Israeli composer and pianist.
Bill Challis, 90, American jazz arranger.
Danny Gatton, 49, American guitarist, suicide.
Shmuel Merlin, 84, Israeli Revisionist Zionist activist and politician.
Effat Nagy, 89, Egyptian artist.
John Opper, 85, American abstract painter.
Andrea Velis, 62, American operatic tenor.

5
Luc Jouret, 46, Belgian religious cult leader, suicide.
Gordon Juckes, 80, Canadian ice hockey administrator.
Nini Rosso, 68, Italian jazz trumpeter and composer, lung cancer.
Walt Schlinkman, 72, American gridiron football player and coach.
William R. Smedberg III, 92, United States Navy vice admiral.
Jacques Tarride, 91, French actor.
Doug Wildey, 72, American cartoonist and comic book artist.

6
Jo Colruyt, 66, Belgian businessman.
Per Mørch Hansson, 89, Norwegian sportsman and businessman.
G. Joseph Tauro, 88, American judge and Chief justice (1970-1976).
Tadeusz Żakiej, 79, Polish musicologist and music publicist, and food writer.

7
Piotr Alberti, 80, Soviet/Russian painter.
Maya Bulgakovа, 62, Soviet/Russian actress, traffic collision.
Bruce Cork, 78, American  physicist.
Ray Ellefson, 66, American basketball player.
Jack Fitzgerald, 80, Irish Labour Party politician.
Carlos Gracie, 92, Brazilian martial artist.
Viktors Hatuļevs, 39, Soviet/Latvian ice hockey defenseman and left winger.
James Hill, 75, British film and television director, screenwriter and producer.
Niels Kaj Jerne, 82, Danish immunologist.
Maurício do Valle, 66, Brazilian film actor, diabetes.

8
Diana Churchill, 81, English actress, multiple sclerosis.
Brian Hartley, 55, British mathematician specialising in group theory, heart attack.
Khaled al-Hassan, 66, Palestinian politician, adviser of Yasser Arafat and founder of militant organization Fatah.
Alan M. Holman, 89, American football player and coach.
Jan de Koning, 68, Dutch politician and social geographer, cancer.
John Neely, 64, American jazz tenor saxophonist and arranger.

9
Raich Carter, 80, English sportsman.
Bill Fox, 95, New Zealand politician.
Idris Hopkins, 83, Welsh football player.
Nikolai Karetnikov, 64, Soviet /Russian composer of underground music.
Fred Lebow, 62, American runner and race director.
Philip Burton Moon, 87, British nuclear physicist.
Lawrence Simmons, 83, American football and baseball coach.
Rolf Thiele, 76, German film director, producer and screenwriter.

10
Richard J. C. Atkinson, 74, British prehistorian and archaeologist.
John C. Champion, 70, American producer and screenwriter.
Nola Luxford, 92, New Zealand-American film actress.
SM Sultan, 71, Bangladeshi painter.

11
Jarvis Hunt, 90, American politician.
Keiji Imai, 77, Japanese sprinter.
Ahmadiyya Jabrayilov, 74, French Resistance member.
Frank McGuire, 79, American basketball coach.

12
John Blackburn, 61, British politician.
Raymond Garrett, 93, Australian military officer, photographer, and politician.
Gérald Godin, 55, Quebec poet and politician.
Werner Kubitzki, 79, German field hockey player.
Manole Marcus, 66, Romanian film director and screenwriter.
Yakov Punkin, 72, Ukrainian featherweight Greco-Roman wrestler.
Sady Rebbot, 59, French actor, cancer.

13
Fiodar Fiodaraŭ, 83, Soviet/Belarusian physicist.
Ture Königson, 84, Swedish evangelical politician.
Eric Morse, 5, American murder victim, fall.
Samuel Jacob Sesanus Olsen, 90, Faroese teacher, writer and translator.
Guido Wolf, 70, Liechtenstein sports shooter.

14
Gioconda de Vito, 87, Italian-British violinist.
Harry Fleer, 78, American actor.
Setu Madhavrao Pagdi, 84, Indian civil servant, polyglot, and historian.
Nikolai Skomorokhov, 74, Soviet Air Forces flying ace during World War II, traffic collision.
Karl Edward Wagner, 48, American writer, poet, editor, and publisher.
Petar Šegedin, 68, Yugoslav steeplechase and long-distance runner.

15
Jean Dasté, 90, Frenck actor and theatre director.
Sarah Kofman, 60, French philosopher, suicide.
George Meader, 87, American politician.
Jozo Tomasevich, 86, American economist and military historian.

16
Peter Bromilow, 61, English actor (Camelot, The Railway Children, The Rocketeer).
Ed Cody, 71, American football player and coach.
Monja Danischewsky, 83, British producer and writer.
Michela Fanini, 21, Italian racing cyclist, traffic collision.
Ganesh Ghosh, 94, Indian independence activist, revolutionary and politician.
Josef Kraft, 73, German Luftwaffe pilot during World War II and later an officer in the German Air Force.

17
George Barrows, 80, American actor.
Ralph Hill, 86, American runner.
Dmitry Kholodov, 27, Russian journalist, homicide.
Gus Risman, 83, Welsh rugby player.

18
Lee Allen, 67, American tenor saxophone player.
Walker Lee Cisler, 97, American engineer and business executive.
Xavier Depraz, 68, French opera singer and actor.
Else Klink, 86, German Eurythmist.
Eddie Mast, 46, American basketball player.
Conchita Montes, 80, Spanish film actress.
Max Müller, 88, German philosopher and Catholic intellectual.
Li Qingwei, 74, People's Republic of China politician.

19
Ray Birdwhistell, 76, American anthropologist.
Hedi Flitz, 94, German politician.
M. C. M. Kaleel, 94, Ceylonese physician, social worker and politician.
Jacopo Napoli, 83, Italian composer.
Martha Raye, 78, American comic actress and singer, pneumonia.
Nyanaponika Thera, 93, German-born Theravada Buddhist monk and scholar.
Oldřich Černík, 72, Czech politician and Prime minister of Czechoslovakia.

20
Sergei Bondarchuk, 74, Soviet/Russian actor, film director, and screenwriter, heart attack.
Shlomo Carlebach, 69, Jewish rabbi, spiritual leader, composer, and singer, heart attack.
Viola Gråsten, 83, Swedish textile designer.
Barbara Ingram, 46, American R&B singer and songwriter.
Hakob Karapents, 69, Iranian-Armenian author.
Burt Lancaster, 80, American actor (From Here to Eternity, Elmer Gantry, Birdman of Alcatraz), Oscar winner (1961), heart attack.
Robert Medley, 88, English artist.
Giacomo Rossi-Stuart, 69, Italian film actor.
Francis Steegmuller, 88, American biographer, translator and fiction writer.

21
Bunny Adair, 89, Australian politician.
Thore Ehrling, 81, Swedish trumpeter, composer, and bandleader.
George H. Gay, 77, United States Navy bomber pilot during World War II.
Jerome Wiesner, 79, American engineer and president of MIT.

22
William Frankena, 86, American moral philosopher.
Harold Hopkins, 75, British physicist.
Handel Manuel, 76, Indian pianist, organist, conductor, composer and accompanist.
Rollo May, 85, American existential psychologist and author).
Jimmy Miller, 52, American record producer and musician, liver disease.
Benoît Régent, 41, French actor, aneurysm.
Andrea Zambelli, 67, Italian bobsledder.

23
Jack Gibson, 86, English schoolmaster, academic and mountaineer.
Robert Lansing, 66, American actor (12 O'Clock High. The Equalizer, Kung Fu: The Legend Continues), cancer.
Bill Leonard, 78, American journalist and television executive, stroke.
Yisroel Ber Odesser, 106, Israeli Breslover Hasid and rabbi.
Cornelis Pama, 77, Dutch bookseller, publisher, heraldist and genealogist.

24
René Clermont, 72, French stage and film actor and playwright.
Sólo̱n Zéfyros Gri̱goriádi̱s, 82, Greek Navy officer, journalist, writer and politician.
Hans Jacobs, 87, German sailplane designer and pioneer.
Edward St John, 78, Australian barrister, anti-nuclear activist and politician.
Raul Julia, 54, Puerto Rican actor (Kiss of the Spider Woman, The Addams Family, Presumed Innocent), Emmy winner (1995), stroke.
John Lautner, 83, American architect.
Ian Potter, 92, Australian stockbroker, businessman and philanthropist.
Guy Powles, 89, New Zealand diplomat, and New Zealand's first Ombudsman.
Alexander Shelepin, 76, Soviet politician and security and intelligence officer.
 Notable people killed in the 1994 Colombo suicide attack
Ossie Abeygunasekera, 44, Sri Lankan politician and Member of Parliament
Gamini Dissanayake, 52, Sri Lankan politician and Leader of the Opposition
Weerasinghe Mallimaratchi, 64, Sri Lankan politician and cabinet minister
G. M. Premachandra, 54, Sri Lankan politician and cabinet minister

25
Yang Dezhi, 83, Chinese general and politician.
George Fallon, 80, American baseball player.
Bob Gantt, 72, American basketball player.
Emil Grünig, 79, Swiss sport shooter.
Lillian Hayman, 72, American actress and singer, heart attack.
Kara Hultgreen, 29, American naval aviator, plane crash.
Hou Jingru, 92, Chinese Army officer and politician.
Antal Kocsis, 88, Hungarian boxer.
József Kozma, 69, Hungarian basketball player.
Karl-Heinz Metzner, 71, German football player.
Mildred Natwick, 89, American actress (Barefoot in the Park, Dangerous Liaisons, The Snoop Sisters), Emmy winner (1974), cancer.
Frank Spaniel, 66, American gridiron football player.

26
Norma Dee Edwards, 82, American politician.
Wilbert Harrison, 65, American rhythm and blues musician, stroke.
Herbert Holba, 62, Austrian film director and screenwriter.
Stella Kübler, 72, German Jewish woman and Gestapo collaborator during WorldWar II, suicide by drowning.
Tutta Rolf, 87, Norwegian-Swedish film and theatre actress and singer.

27
Kay Bell, 80, American gridiron football player, cancer.
Wally Halder, 69, Canadian ice hockey player.
James Schwarzenbach, 83, Swiss right-wing politician and publicist.
Omar Wahrouch, 68, Moroccan singer-poet  and songwriter.
Robert White, 57, American soul musician and a guitarist (Funk Brothers).

28
William Boon, 83, British chemist.
Marcia Anastasia Christoforides, 85, British philanthropist, art collector, and racehorse owner.
Calvin Souther Fuller, 92, American physical chemist at AT&T Bell Laboratories.
Doghmi Larbi, 63, Moroccan actor.
Ramakrushna Nanda, 88, Indian writer, educator and children's author.
Irene Robertson, 62, American hurdler.

29
Shlomo Goren, 77, Polish-Israeli Orthodox Religious Zionist rabbi and Talmudic scholar.
Ernst Heinrichsohn, 74, German lawyer and SS officer during World War II.
Jalmari Kivenheimo, 105, Finnish gymnast.
Manuel Barbachano Ponce, 69, Mexican film producer, director, and screenwriter.
Pearl Primus, 74, American dancer, choreographer and anthropologist.
Jimmy Swan, 81, American country musician.

30
Frank Coggins, 50, American baseball player.
Oakley C. Collins, 78, American politician.
Nicholas Georgescu-Roegen, 88, Romanian mathematician, statistician and economist, diabetes.
Swaran Singh, 87, Indian politician, heart attack.

31
Hal Ellson, 84, American author of pulp fiction, heart attack.
John Pope-Hennessy, 80, British art historian.
Lester Sill, 76, American record label executive.
Erling Stordahl, 71, Norwegian farmer and singer.

References 

1994-10
 10